The University Presbyterian Church in Seattle, Washington, United States is a Presbyterian Church (U.S.A.) congregation with 3,418 members in 2012, 2,434 in 2021. The current senior pastor is George Hinman.

The church was founded in 1908. The church had a large membership increase during the 1980s, when it was led by pastor Bruce Larson; Larson subsequently became co-pastor of the Crystal Cathedral in Garden Grove, California. 

In 2001, the average weekly attendance was 5,000 (marking it as a megachurch at th etime); as of 2021 it is 800.

Earl Palmer was senior pastor for 15 years, following Bruce Larson and preceding George Hinman. 

Palmer retired to form Earl Palmer Ministries where he continues teaching ministering, and mentoring.

Palmer's articles, videos, and sermons can be heard and downloaded from his web site, including episodes from the Kindlings Muse, Earl's lectures on C. S. Lewis, and hundreds of sermons reaching back to the ’70s.

The current organ was completed in 1999. The Reuter Organ, Opus 2196, was built in Lawrence Kansas.The organ committee, their consultant, Joseph Adam, and organist JoAnn Stremler helped collaborate on the new organ’s design with Reuter’s regional representative, David R. Salmen.

Senior Pastor Dr. Earl F. Palmer said of the organ: "In this house of worship we call University Presbyterian Church, that gift of great and tender sound is ours. Tears still well up in my eyes when I hear its subtlety and grandeur." 

University Presbyterian Church provides ministries for "the mentally ill, homeless, teens living on the streets, and those who are in prison." The congregation was a pioneer in the practice of sending short-term mission teams overseas.

External links

References 

 

Churches in Seattle
Presbyterian Church (USA) churches
Christian organizations established in 1908
1908 establishments in Washington (state)